Potlotek First Nation, also known as Chapel Island, is a Mi'kmaw community in northeastern Nova Scotia. The community is situated in Richmond County, Nova Scotia, Canada. As of 2022, the First Nation has approximately 800 band members living on and off reserve.

Composition
Chapel Island First Nation is composed of two parts as shown:

References

External links
Official website
FirstVoices Mi'kmaw Community Portal

First Nations governments in Atlantic Canada
First Nations in Nova Scotia
Mi'kmaq governments
Communities in Richmond County, Nova Scotia